Christian French may refer to:

Christianity in France
Christian French (singer) (born 1997), American singer
Christian (French actor) (1821–1889), French actor